Villa de Arevalo, commonly known as simply Villa or Arevalo, is one of the seven districts of Iloilo City in the province of Iloilo, on the island of Panay in Western Visayas, in the Philippines. According to the 2020 census, it has a population of 55,476 people. Arevalo is the westernmost district of Iloilo City and it borders Oton to the west.

Its church, Santo Niño de Arevalo Parish, possesses the third oldest Santo Niño (Infant Jesus) image in the Philippines. Arevalo is sometimes given the title "Flower Capital of Iloilo", where potted plants, flowers, bouquets, wreaths can be bought. Arevalo is also famous for its firecrackers and fireworks. Its prominent attraction is the Villa Beach (Playa de Villa de Arevalo) along the coast which boasts several resorts and an outdoor nightlife such as open air restaurants and bars.

Camiña Balay nga Bato (formally known as the Avanceña Ancestral House) is a heritage house and a restaurant in Arevalo that was constructed in 1865. It is one of the best heritage attractions in Iloilo serving the traditional Filipino way-made tsokolate.

History 
Villa de Arevalo was established in 1566 when Spanish conquerors established a settlement in the areas between it and the neighboring town of Oton. It was formally founded as La Villa Rica de Arévalo by Gobernador Ronquillo de Peñalosa in 1581, named after his hometown Arévalo, Spain. It is one of the first places in the Philippine archipelago to be named in Spanish. 

The founding population consisted of 80 colonists who were pure Spaniards from Europe and reinforced by 169 Mexican soldiers from Latin America. and It became the capital of the settlement in the province on 1582. It was invaded by the British in 1588 and followed by more raids by Moros in 1600 and by the Dutch in 1609, 1614 and 1616. The continuous raids forced the capital to be relocated near the mouth of Iloilo River, which is the current location of Iloilo City Proper. 

It was incorporated as a district of Iloilo City on July 16, 1937, along with the towns of Mandurriao, La Paz, and Molo.

Barangays
The district of Arevalo has 13 barangays.

Education
Melchor L. Nava National High School, named after Melchor Nava the former barangay captain of Calaparan.
Ramon Avanceña National High School, named after Ramon Avanceña the former Chief Justice.
John B. Lacson Foundation Maritime University-Arevalo campus, formerly known as Iloilo Maritime Academy.

Culture

Santo Niño de Arevalo Parish 
The district's parish, the Santo Niño de Arevalo Parish, is home to the third oldest Santo Niño figure in the Philippines. The church was built in such a way that when seen from above it is shaped like a cross. Adjacent to the church is the Arevalo Convent, a heritage building in a Spanish colonial design. Residing parish priest is Rev. Fr. Jose Gerardo Classico Nufable.

Arevalo Town Fiesta
In January, Arevalo celebrates its town fiesta in honor of the Santo Niño. The festivities take place during the month of January, the Fiesta day is held every 3rd Sunday of January. During Fiesta day households open their doors and prepare food for fiesta goers, friends, visitors and distant relatives. A fireworks display contest is one of the highlights of the celebration held on the night of the town fiesta

Paraw Regatta Festival
Arevalo hosts the annual Paraw Regatta, which is the oldest traditional craft event in Asia, and the largest sailing event in the Philippines. A paraw is a Filipino double-outrigger sailboat much like a pump boat which was used for transportation and fishing and still is in limited areas.

The main event is the paraw boat race along Iloilo Strait and also showcases Pinta Layag, sail painting contest; Porma Balas, sand sculpting; Pintawo, body painting contest; Miss Paraw Regatta, a local beauty pageant; Samba De Regatta, music & Mardi Gras contest; Luces by the Sea, a pyrotechnic exhibition; beach volleyball; and photo competition.

Transportation
Transportation is mainly by jeepney which serves the district to the Iloilo City Proper. Metered taxi cabs also serve the traveling public. Tricycles and trisikads operate within the district. The Don Benito Acap Southern Iloilo Line Jeepney Terminal (Mohon Terminal) in the district serves the routes to and from southern Iloilo towns and the province of Antique.

See also 

 Paraw Regatta

References

External links

 Iloilo City Government Official Website

Districts of Iloilo City
Former municipalities of the Philippines
Former provincial capitals of the Philippines